Scout is a comic book series by American writer, artist and musician Timothy Truman. It was published by Eclipse Comics beginning in 1985.

The story stars a Native American Apache named Emanuel Santana. The setting of the series is a dystopian United States that has become a Third World country.

Publication history
Twenty-four issues of the first series were published.

After the series ended, a short comic featuring Santana's marriage ceremony was published inside Timothy Truman's first album release entitled Marauder by his band The Dixie Pistols.

Two mini-series were published that 'bridged the gap' between the two Scout series: New America and Swords of Texas, each four issues long.  While Truman oversaw them, others (including Ben Dunn) wrote and drew them. A one-shot 'Scout Handbook' was also published.

A new series entitled Scout: War Shaman continued Santana's adventures after having two children and being widowed. The series ended with issue #16, after Scout is killed. Further series were planned, Scout: Marauder and Scout: Blue Leader, but never appeared. Scout: Marauder, described as "the first volume in a new graphic novel series", was successfully funded on Kickstarter in 2018.

Plot
A history of ecological excesses had led other nations to levy vast sanctions against the US for "stealing" world resources.

Author Michael A. Sheyahshe noted in Native Americans in Comic Books – A Critical Study, that "Scout is presented in a respectful and genuine manner with tribally specific cultural ties".

Collected editions
Eclipse printed two trade paperback collections of the comic: Scout: Four Monsters (#1–7), and Scout: Mount Fire (#8–14).

As well, Dynamite Entertainment published a series of reprints:
 Volume 1 (collects Scout #1–7, 136 pages, November 2006)
 Volume 2 (collects Scout #8–16, 140 pages, August 2008)

Film adaptation
In October 2016, Christopher MacBride was set to adapt and direct for the big screen for Studio 8. Jon Silk and Hell or High Water’s Braden Aftergood were to produce the film and Truman serving as a consultant.

References

External links

Scout at Don Markstein's Toonopedia. Archived from the original on March 29, 2017.

American comics
1985 comics debuts
1987 comics endings
Fictional Apache people
Dystopian comics
Comics characters introduced in 1985
Native Americans in popular culture